Turn Castle may refer to several castles or manors in Slovenia:

Turn Castle, Brestanica, a smaller castle below Rajhenburg Castle in the Municipality of Krško 
Turn Castle, Gornja Bitnja, a 17th-century mansion in the Municipality of Ilirska Bistrica
Turn Castle, Ig, a 14th-century castle in the  Municipality of Ig
Turn Castle, Preddvor, a 14th-century castle in the Municipality of Preddvor
Turn Castle, Leskovec pri Krškem, a 16th-century castle in the Municipality of Krško
, in the City Municipality of Velenje